For the 2008 automatic rifle cartridge of a similar name, see .30 Remington AR.

The .30 Remington cartridge was created in 1906 by Remington Arms. It was Remington's rimless answer to the popular .30-30 Winchester cartridge. Factory ammunition was produced until the late 1980s, but now it is a prospect for handloaders. It is the parent case for the 6.8mm Remington SPC.

The .30 Remington, along with the 25 Remington, .32 Remington. and .35 Remington were created for use in the Remington Model 8 rifle, to compete against the .25-35 Winchester, .30-30 Winchester and .32 Winchester Special. The Remington Model 14 was also chambered for the four new Remington cartridges.

Unlike the .30-30, the .30 Remington can utilize standard pointed bullets rather than round nosed ones when used in rifles with box magazines (Remington Model 8) and ones with special tubular magazines (Remington Model 14). This gives it a possible advantage over the .30-30 cartridge which is most often chambered in lever-action rifles with standard tubular magazines (in which a conventional pointed bullet could lead to cartridges being ignited in the magazine tube by recoiling into a primer).

See Also
List of rifle cartridges

References

Pistol and rifle cartridges
Remington Arms cartridges